Mine surveying is the practice of determining the relative positions of points on or beneath the surface of the earth by direct or indirect measurements of distance, direction & elevation.

International and National Institutions 

 International Society for Mine Surveying (ISM)
 Australian Institute of Mine Surveyiors (AIMS)
 Czech Society of Mine Surveyors and Geologists (SDMG)
 German Mine Surveying Association (DMV e.V)
 Polish Mine Surveying Committee (PK-ISM)
 Institute of Mine Surveyors of South Africa (IMSSA)

See also 
 Surveying
 Land subsidence
 geological survey
 spatial sciences

References

Mining engineering
Civil engineering